Colonel Harvey Washington Walter (1819–1878) was an American lawyer and railroad business executive. He served as the President of the Mississippi Central Railroad. During the Civil War, he invited Union General Ulysses Grant and his wife, Julia Grant, to stay in his mansion, Walter Place. He succumbed to the yellow fever after turning it into a hospital for patients in 1878.

Early life
Harvey Washington Walter was born in Fairfield, Ohio on May 21, 1819.

Career
Walter moved to Holly Springs, Mississippi, where he practised the Law. He also served as the President of the Mississippi Central Railroad.

During the Civil War, Colonel Walter served as a Judge Advocate under General Bragg in the Confederate States Army. However, he was staunchly opposed to secession, and he invited Union General Ulysses Grant and his wife, Julia Grant, to stay in his house for the duration of the war. When Confederate General Earl Van Dorn liberated Holly Springs, Walter forbid him to enter the house until Julia Grant has gone out. To thank him, the Union Army did not ransack the house.  Julia Dent Grant's version of this story, as published in her memoirs, differs slightly.  She wrote that she had actually left Holly Springs and was en route to join her husband when the Confederate soldiers took over the town. She goes on to say that Van Dorn's men wanted to take her belongings, but were refused access to the Walter's house, but they did burn her coach and take the horses.  Van Dorn's intention was not to liberate the town but to destroy materiel that may have been of benefit to the Union troops and then withdraw.

In 1878, Walter turned his mansion into a hospital for patients with the yellow fever. He sent away his wife and youngest children, but his three sons remained to help.  All  four died of the disease within a week of each other

Personal life
Walter married Fredonia Brown (1830-1898). They had five sons and five daughters.

In 1858–1860, he commissioned architect Spires Boling to build Walter Place, a mansion in Holly Springs, Mississippi.

Death and legacy
Walter died of yellow fever in 1878. He was buried at the Hillcrest Cemetery in Holly Springs, Mississippi. His mansion, Walter Place, was inherited by his widow until it was acquired by his son-in-law, Oscar Johnson Sr., the co-founder of the International Shoe Company and husband of daughter Irene, in 1889.

References

External links

1819 births
1878 deaths
People from Fairfield, Ohio
People from Holly Springs, Mississippi
Businesspeople from Mississippi
19th-century American railroad executives
Confederate States Army officers
Deaths from yellow fever
19th-century American lawyers